ELEAGUE Street Fighter V Invitational, also known as ELEAGUE Season 3, is the third season of ELEAGUE. After two seasons with Counter-Strike: Global Offensive, the league announced that it will expand to fighting games with Street Fighter V. The season will run from March 27, 2017, to May 26, 2017, and will be broadcast on cable television on TBS and online on Twitch. The season will feature 32 players overall and 24 players in the main tournament from across the world to compete.

The third season of ELEAGUE started with Victor "Punk" Woodley defeating Bryant "Smug" Huggin 2–0 in a best of three. The official season began with Smug defeating Julio Fuentes 3–0 in a best of five series. The season concluded with Punk defeating Arman "Phenom" Hanjani 4–2 in a best of seven series to take home 150,000 of the 250,000 prize pool.

Format
ELEAGUE will invite thirty-two players from around the world to compete in the tournament. Sixteen of the players will be invited based on their 2016 Capcom Pro Tour results and the other sixteen will receive invites from Capcom. This stage will be the preliminaries. Players will be separated into four groups of eight. The top six players from each group will advance to the regular season. All matches will be best of three. This will run from March 27, 2017, to March 30, 2017.

Twenty-four players will play in the regular season. They will be divided into four groups of six. There will be two phases in the regular season. The top two players from the preliminaries will automatically advance to the second phase. The other four players will play in a group stage robin round. The third seed and the sixth seed will play each other and the fourth and fifth seeds will play each other in the initial matches. The two losers and the two winners will then play each other. The winner of the winner's map will move on to phase two and the loser of the loser's matches will be eliminated. The decider match between the two remaining players will determine which player moves to the second phase and which player gets eliminated. In phase two, the remaining four players will play in a single elimination, best of five bracket. The winners of the matches will move on to the playoffs.

Eight players remain as they head to the playoffs. The winners of the groups will be placed in the upper bracket and the runners-up of the groups will be placed in the lower bracket. Players will play in an eight-man double-elimination bracket, meaning a loss from a player in the upper bracket is still alive, but heads into the lower bracket. Once a player loses in the lower bracket, that player is eliminated from the tournament. The players will continue to play until a winner is decided. All matches will be best of five. The playoffs will all take place on May 26.

Players competing
The thirty-two players competing in the tournament are as follows:

Broadcast talent
Host
 Richard Lewis
Commentators/Analysts
 Zhi Liang Chew
 Stephen "Sajam" Lyon
 Reepal "Rip" Parbhoo
 Steve "Tasty Steve" Scott
Interviewer
 Malik Fortè

Preliminaries (March 27–30, 2017)
The preliminary groups were announced on March 2, 2017. There are four groups of eight players and six players from each group move on to the regular season.

Group A (March 27th)

Group B (March 28th)

Group C (March 29th)

Group D (March 30th)

Regular Season (April 7-May 12, 2017)

Group A (April 7th)

Phase One
<noinclude>

Phase Two
<noinclude>

Group B (April 21st)

Phase One
<noinclude>

Phase Two
<noinclude>

Group C (May 5th)

Phase One
<noinclude>

Phase Two
<noinclude>

Group D (May 12th)

Phase One
<noinclude>

Phase Two
<noinclude>

Playoffs (May 26th, 2017)

Final standings

References

Fighting game tournaments